is a JR East railway station located in Kita, Tokyo, Japan. It is served by both the rapid and local trains.

Line
 Keihin-Tōhoku Line

Station Layout
This station consists of a single island platform serving two tracks.

Platforms

Surrounding area
 National printing bureau
 Kyu-Furukawa Gardens

History
1933-07-01: Station begins operation.

References

Railway stations in Japan opened in 1933
Keihin-Tōhoku Line
Railway stations in Tokyo